The 1965 Pacific Tigers football team represented the University of the Pacific during the 1965 NCAA College Division football season.

Pacific competed as an independent in 1965. They played home games in Pacific Memorial Stadium in Stockton, California. In their second (and last) season under head coach Don Campora, the Tigers finished with a record of one win and eight losses (1–8). For the 1965 season they were outscored by their opponents 81–250.

Schedule

Team players in the NFL
No University of the Pacific players were selected in the 1965 NFL Draft.

The following finished their college career at Pacific, were not drafted, but played in the AFL or NFL starting with the 1966 season.

Notes

References

Pacific
Pacific Tigers football seasons
Pacific Tigers football